Tom Colbjørnsen (born 31 May 1951 in Oslo) is a Norwegian economist and sociologist, and was the President of the BI Norwegian Business School from 2006-2014.

Colbjørnsen graduated from the Norwegian School of Economics (NHH) with a siv.øk. degree in 1976 and received his dr.philos. degree from the University of Bergen in 1984. He was a professor at NHH when he in 2006 was appointed as the new President at BI Norwegian Business School.

Publications 
Colbjørnsen has been the author and editor of a large number of academic books and articles. Books, a selection:
 Colbjørnsen, Tom. Dividers in the labor market. Norwegian University Press, 1986.
 Gustavsen, Björn, Tom Colbjørnsen, and Øyvind Pålshaugen, eds. Development coalitions in working life: the ‘Enterprise Development 2000’Program in Norway. Vol. 6. John Benjamins Publishing, 1998.

Articles, a selection:
 Colbjørnsen, Tom, and Arne L. Kalleberg. "Spillover, standardization and stratification: earnings determination in the United States and Norway." European Sociological Review 4.1 (1988): 20-31.
 Colbjørnsen, Tom, and Eivind Falkum. "Corporate efficiency and employee participation." Development Coalitions in Working Life: the ‘Enterprise Development 2000’Program in Norway (1998): 34-5.

References 

1951 births
Living people
Writers from Oslo
Norwegian economists
Norwegian sociologists
Norwegian business theorists
Academic staff of the Norwegian School of Economics
Academic staff of BI Norwegian Business School
Rectors of BI Norwegian Business School